Aparajita Tumi is a 2012 Indian Bengali-language drama film directed by Aniruddha Roy Chowdhury. The film stars Prosenjit Chatterjee, Kamalinee Mukherjee, Padmapriya Janakiraman, Chandan Roy Sanyal, Indraneil Sengupta. It is a venture of director Aniruddha Roy Chowdhury after his successful and critically acclaimed movie Antaheen. This film also had Shantanu Moitra as music director and Anindya and Chandril as lyricists like Tony's previous film. The film is an adaptation of the novel Dui Nari Hathe Tarbari by famous Bengali writer Sunil Gangopadhyay.

Plot

Pradip and Kuhu, an NRI couple with two children, start having problems because of Kuhu's straightforward nature and blatant comments which end up hurting people. Ushoshi and Ronojoy are another couple. While Ronojoy seems to be a cynical workaholic who is not bothered about the voids in his life, Ushoshi is extremely sensitive about things like their childlessness. As Kuhu repeatedly hurts the insecure Ushoshi, Pradip finds himself empathizing with her, and they eventually end up having an affair. Kuhu moves out with her children, whom she temporarily places in the care of her parents, while she takes time to think about her next step. Meanwhile, she has a brief encounter with ex-boyfriend Yusuf, which brings back nostalgic memories, pain and loneliness. While Yusuf is clearly interested in a relationship, Kuhu is cold and distant, which finally drives him away.

Meanwhile, Pradip suffers from splitting headaches, and it is soon discovered that he has cancer. As he battles the disease, Kuhu finally comes back, perhaps forgiving him. Ushoshi's husband learns of her affair with Pradip, and profoundly eccentric and cynical as he is, he sets her free to choose what she wants to do next without complaint. Ushoshi comes to visit Pradip, and Kuhu behaves quite normally with her, attempting to brush aside any bitterness. Ushoshi says that she has decided to return to India, and leaves without saying goodbye to Pradip.

In the end, Kuhu is seen alone on a beach, clutching a book of poems Yusuf had presented her, and along with that, she holds a letter he had left her, mentioning how he was going away, not willing to disturb her anymore.

Cast
 Padmapriya Janakiraman as Kuhu
 Prosenjit Chatterjee as Pradip
 Kamalinee Mukherjee as Ushashi
 Chandan Roy Sanyal as Ranojoy
 Indraneil Sengupta as Yusuf
 Tanusree Shankar as Kuhu's mother
 Kalyan Ray as Kuhu's uncle
 Soumitra Chatterjee in a guest appearance as himself
 Emielyn Das as Pradip's daughter, Chandra
 Rik Dev Mukherji as Robi

Soundtrack
The song Roopkathara was a chart topper and received rave reviews from the audience.

Awards

Padmapriya Nominated for National Award for Best Actress Category

See also
 Bengali films of 2012

References

External links
 

2012 films
Bengali-language Indian films
2010s Bengali-language films
Films based on Indian novels
Films directed by Aniruddha Roy Chowdhury
Films based on works by Sunil Gangopadhyay